Icy Cape Air Force Station is an abandoned United States Air Force Distant Early Warning Line Radar station at Icy Cape on the Chukchi Sea coast of northwestern Alaska, United States.   It was closed in 1963.

History
The Station was built in 1957 to support the Distant Early Warning Line as Icy Cape (LIZ-B). The station was logistically supported by the 711th Aircraft Control and Warning Squadron based at Cape Lisburne Air Force Station, although Icy Cape was operated by civilian contract workers.

It was closed in 1963 and has been abandoned ever since.  The radars and other military buildings were removed around 2000, returning the site to a natural condition.  The gravel streets and the runway of the former airstrip of the station remain.

References

External links
 Icy Cape DEW Line Station photo site

Installations of the United States Air Force in Alaska
Radar stations of the United States Air Force
Buildings and structures in North Slope Borough, Alaska
1957 establishments in Alaska
1963 disestablishments in Alaska
Military installations established in 1957
Military installations closed in 1963